Class 113 can refer to:

Class 113 - British diesel multiple unit, a version of the Class 112
DB Class E 10 - German electric locomotive